Copala is one of the 81 municipalities of Guerrero, in south-western Mexico. The municipal seat lies at Copala. It is known for its beach, Playa Ventura. The municipality covers an area of 344.4 km².

As of 2005, the municipality had a total population of 11,896.

References

Municipalities of Guerrero